Capital punishment is retained in law by 55 UN member states or observer states, with 140 having abolished it in law or in practice. The most recent legal executions performed by nations and other entities with criminal law jurisdiction over the people present within its boundaries are listed below. Extrajudicial executions and killings are not included. In general, executions performed in the territory of a sovereign state when it was a colony or before the sovereign state gained independence are not included. The colours on the map correspond to and have the same meanings as the colours in the charts.

Africa

Americas

United States

Asia

Europe

Oceania

Australia

See also
Capital punishment by country

References

External links
Death Penalty Worldwide  Academic research database on the laws, practice, and statistics of capital punishment for every death penalty country in the world.
Monthly updates of world-wide executions

 Most recent
 Most recent
 Most recent
Most recent executions by jurisdiction